Nordkvaløya is an island in the municipality of Karlsøy in Troms og Finnmark county, Norway. The island is situated north of the islands of Ringvassøya and west of Helgøya. The Norwegian Sea borders to the northwest. The  island of Nordkvaløya is very rugged and mountainous. In 2017, the island had 3 residents.

See also
List of islands of Norway

References

Karlsøy
Islands of Troms og Finnmark